The 1958 winners of the Torneo di Viareggio (in English, the Viareggio Tournament, officially the Viareggio Cup World Football Tournament Coppa Carnevale), the annual youth football tournament held in Viareggio, Tuscany, are listed below.

Format

The 16 teams are organized in knockout rounds. The round of 16 are played in two-legs, while the rest of the rounds are single tie.

Participating teams

Italian teams

  Alessandria
  Atalanta
  Fiorentina
  Genoa
  Lanerossi Vicenza
  Milan
  Roma
  Sampdoria
  Udinese
  Zenit Modena

European teams

  Partizan Beograd
  Hajduk Split
  Racing Paris
  Deportivo Barcelona
  Progresul București
  Spartak Praha

Tournament fixtures

Champions

Footnotes

External links
 Official Site (Italian)
 Results on RSSSF.com

1958
1957–58 in Italian football
1957–58 in Yugoslav football
1957–58 in Czechoslovak football
1957–58 in Spanish football
1957–58 in Romanian football
1957–58 in French football